Yanguas de Eresma is a municipality located in the province of Segovia, Castile and León, Spain. According to the 2004 census (INE), the municipality had a population of 196 inhabitants.

See also
 Yanguas – a different community in a nearby province

References

Municipalities in the Province of Segovia